Wang Wan (693-751), was a Tang dynasty Chinese poet. Ten of his poems are preserved, and the most famous poem among those is "A Mooring Under North Fort Hill". Chinese prime minister, Wen Jiabao, quoted the poem in the lecture of Cambridge University in England.

Poetry
Wang Wan was attracted by mountains and lakes in Jiangnan and influenced by the delicate style of poetry at that time. So he wrote some works to chant the beautiful mountains and lakes.

A Mooring Under North Fort Hill 
This poem was praised highly by the dignitary and became the model of many scholars to learn from. The spectacles this poem expressed also made deep impression on the Tang poetry. We can also see the poem in the Chinese textbook of grade seven. What’s more, Chinese prime minister, Wen Jiabao, quoted the poem in the lecture of Cambridge University.

External links

 Washington Chinese Poetry Society
 

Tang dynasty poets
693 births
751 deaths
Writers from Luoyang
Poets from Henan
8th-century Chinese poets